Ydessa Hendeles is a German-born Canadian artist-curator and philanthropist. She is also the founding director of the Ydessa Hendeles Art Foundation in Toronto, Ontario.

Hendeles is an adjunct professor with the Department of Art History at the University of Toronto, where she has endowed the Ydessa Hendeles Art Foundation Distinguished Lecturer on Art series of presentations. In 2009, she donated 32 works of International and Canadian contemporary art to the Art Gallery of Ontario, the most significant single gift of contemporary art in the gallery’s history. The donation led the institution to cite her as one who “has brought a distinctive Canadian perspective to the world stage while setting a standard for art philanthropy.”

Life

Ydessa Hendeles was born in the university town of Marburg, Germany. Her parents, Jacob Hendeles and Dorothy Zweigel, were Polish Jews who both survived imprisonment in the Auschwitz and later Bergen-Belsen concentration camps. The Hendeles family immigrated to Canada when Ydessa was two years old, making Toronto their home.

A graduate of the University of Toronto, the New School of Art and the Toronto Art Therapy Institute, Hendeles earned her PhD from the Amsterdam School for Cultural Analysis at the University of Amsterdam.

Career
In 1980, Hendeles established The Ydessa Gallery in Toronto, a commercial space devoted to the presentation of Canadian contemporary art. The gallery represented such artists as Kim Adams, Shelagh Alexander, Tony Brown, FASTWÜRMS, Andreas Gehr, Rodney Graham, Noel Harding, Nancy Johnson, Ken Lum, Liz Magor, John Massey, John McEwen, Peter Hill, Sandra Meigs, Jana Sterbak, Jeff Wall and Krzysztof Wodiczko. Hendeles closed The Ydessa Gallery in 1988.

In October 1987, Hendeles purchased a two-storey industrial building located at 778 King Street West in downtown Toronto as the new foundation's headquarters and exhibition site. In November 1988, after extensive renovations, the 14,000-square-foot former uniforms factory became home of the Ydessa Hendeles Art Foundation, Canada's first privately supported contemporary-art exhibition space.

Hendeles launched her exhibition program in December 1987 with Katharina Fritsch: Our Lady of Lourdes, presented at the Toronto Eaton Centre (the city's most popular downtown shopping mall). For the week leading up to Christmas, the peak of the mall's busiest shopping season, Hendeles installed Fritsch's sculpture of a small Madonna of Lourdes statue, enlarged to adult size and rendered in bright, yellow-painted Duroplast resin, in the middle of the pedestrian mall. The sculpture was positioned so the Church of the Holy Trinity, the historic Anglican Church adjacent to the western side of the mall would be visible in the background.

The Ydessa Hendeles Art Foundation was formally established in 1988 with a mandate to provide a program of contemporary-art exhibitions from a developing collection. In November 1988, the gallery space opened its inaugural show, Christian Boltanski, a five-gallery exhibition of the French artist’s work. This  included the site-specific commission Canada (1988), the artist's first clothing-based work.

In 1996, Maclean's magazine published a profile by Sharon Doyle Driedger on Hendeles and her exhibition program at the Ydessa Hendeles Art Foundation. In the article, Driedger noted Hendeles’s influence on the art world:

Hendeles has managed to pique the interest of the art world by collecting and showing works by such luminaries as British photographer Eadweard Muybridge and American sculptor Louise Bourgeois. “These works are sought after by any great institution in the world,” says Marcel Brisebois, director of the Montreal Museum of Contemporary Art. “She has a great eye. When she buys something, we look at her and say, ‘Oh, why is she doing so?’” Her bold aesthetic vision led ARTnews, a respected U.S. journal, to twice include her in its list of “the art world’s 50 most influential people” in 1993 and 1995—the only Canadian and one of just a handful of women. “Every museum curator who is not asleep knows about her,” says Robert Storr, a curator at New York City’s renowned Museum of Modern Art. Storr adds that for exhibitions of videos, films, photography and installations, “there is absolutely no better place in the world” than Hendeles’s foundation.

In his book Private Spaces for Contemporary Art (2010), Peter Doroshenko described the Ydessa Hendeles Art Foundation as functioning “more like an intellectual visual arts laboratory than an art centre or private collection space,” and declared its gallery “one of the most important contemporary spaces in North America.”

The Ydessa Hendeles Art Foundation maintained its exhibition program in Toronto until 2012, when its building was sold and the gallery closed its doors. The Foundation, however, continues to function as a not-for-profit organization in Toronto, and in 2015 it established a studio/office in the upper west side of Manhattan in the former studio of the photographer Philippe Halsman at the historic Atelier building.

Exhibitions
In 2003, Hendeles guest-curated Partners, a 16-gallery exhibition for the Haus der Kunst, Munich, at the invitation of then-incoming director Chris Dercon and the new chief curator, Thomas Weski. For Partners Hendeles combined work by Diane Arbus, Maurizio Cattelan, James Coleman, Hanne Darboven, Walker Evans, Luciano Fabro, On Kawara, Paul McCarthy, Bruce Nauman, Giulio Paolini,  Jeff Wall and Lawrence Weiner, together with series of photojournalistic images, anonymous vernacular photographs and antique vernacular objects. This exhibition also included Hendeles’s own artwork Partners (The Teddy Bear Project), 2002, a large-scale installation built around an archive of family-album photographs, each including the image of a teddy bear (see external link below). This exhibition was also the subject of French Filmmaker Agnès Varda’s 2004 documentary,  Ydessa, the Bears and etc.

Partners (The Teddy Bear Project) was first shown in the group exhibition sameDIFFERENCE at the Ydessa Hendeles Art Foundation in Toronto (2002). It was expanded as a two-gallery installation for Partners at Munich’s Haus der Kunst (2003), then remounted in Noah’s Ark by the National Gallery of Canada (2004) and 10,000 Lives, the 2010 Gwangju Biennale, South Korea. It was exhibited again in 2016 at New York's New Museum in The Keeper, a group show curated by Massimiliano Gioni.

Other exhibitions include Marburg! The Early Bird! at the Marburger Kunstverein (de), Germany (2010); The Wedding (The Walker Evans Polaroid Project) at Andrea Rosen Gallery, New York (2011); and THE BIRD THAT MADE THE BREEZE TO BLOW at Galerie Johann König, Berlin (2012). Her work From her wooden sleep... (2013) was shown at the Institute of Contemporary Arts (ICA), London, UK in 2015, curated by Philip Larratt-Smith (see external link below). In 2016, Hendeles expanded and augmented From her wooden sleep… specifically for the Helena Rubinstein Pavilion for Contemporary Art at the Tel Aviv Museum of Art, Israel, curated by Suzanne Landau.

Hendeles is represented by Barbara Edwards Contemporary, Toronto. Her first exhibition for the gallery, Death to Pigs was presented in the fall of 2016. An exhibition catalogue for Death to Pigs was published in 2018.

In the summer of 2017, Hendeles’s exhibition The Milliner’s Daughter was shown at Toronto’s The Power Plant Contemporary Art Gallery, curated by Gaëtane Verna. This was the first major survey of Hendeles’s work in a public museum.

In 2018, the Kunsthalle Wien mounted Death to Pigs, the first institutional retrospective of Hendeles’s work in Europe. Curated by Nicolaus Schafhausen (Director, Kunsthalle Wien), the exhibition was spread over both floors of the Kunsthalle and included work by the artist drawn from the past decade.

In 2019, Schafhausen featured Hendeles’s work, The Steeple and The People (2018), a site-specific installation at Munich’s Abtei St. Bonifaz (St. Boniface's Abbey) as part of the group exhibition Tell me about yesterday tomorrow he curated for NS-Dokumentationszentrum München (Munich Documentation Centre for the History of National Socialism).

Awards and recognition 

Hendeles was inducted as a Member into the Order of Canada in 2004 and the Order of Ontario in 1998. She received a Governor General’s Award in 2002 for "Outstanding Contribution in the Visual and Media Arts." She was awarded a Queen Elizabeth II Golden Jubilee Medal in 2002 and a Queen Elizabeth II Diamond Jubilee Medal in 2012.

Hendeles received an Honorary Doctorate of Fine Art (D.F.A. h.c.) from the Nova Scotia College of Art and Design in 1996, an Honorary Doctorate of Laws (LL.D. h.c.) from the University of Toronto in 2000 and an Honorary Doctorate of Philosophy (Dr.phil h.c.) from Philipps-Universität Marburg in 2017. She was named an Honorary Fellow of the Ontario College of Art and Design (now OCAD University) in 1998
and received an "Award of Distinction" from the Faculty of Fine Arts of Concordia University, Montreal in 2009.

Hendeles received the 2004 "Founders Achievement Award," presented by the Toronto Friends of the Visual Arts and the 2003 “Award of Distinction,” from the Toronto International Art Fair (now Art Toronto). In 2007, she was named a Life Member of Art Metropole, Toronto.

The Ontario Association of Art Galleries (OAAG) has honoured Hendeles with multiple awards:
Award for Outstanding Achievement (1998), conferred in its inaugural year in recognition of the “curatorial excellence and innovative programming at the Ydessa Hendeles Art Foundation.”
Best Exhibition Installation and Design Award (2003), for sameDIFFERENCE at Ydessa Hendeles Art Foundation
Exhibition of the Year Award (2003), for sameDIFFERENCE at Ydessa Hendeles Art Foundation
Special Recognition Award (2007), for the exhibition Predators & Prey at Ydessa Hendeles Art Foundation
Special Recognition Award (2008), for the exhibition Dead! Dead! Dead! at Ydessa Hendeles Art Foundation
Exhibition of the Year Award (2011), for Marburg! The Early Bird! at the Marburger Kunstverein, Germany
Art Publication of the Year Award (2017), for her artist’s book From her wooden sleep…, published by Hatje Cantz

In 2003, The Globe and Mail, Canada’s national newspaper chose Hendeles as its “Artist of the Year.”

Publications
Partners, edited by Chris Dercon and Thomas Weski (Haus der Kunst, Munich and Buchhandlung Walther König, Cologne), 2003
Predators & Prey. Notes (Ydessa Hendeles Art Foundation, Toronto), 2006
The Tragical Comedy or Comical Tragedy of Punch & Judy (Ydessa Hendeles Art Foundation, Toronto), 2007
Curatorial Compositions. Doctoral Thesis (University of Amsterdam), 2009
Marburg! The Early Bird! Notes at an Exhibition (Ydessa Hendeles Art Foundation, Toronto), 2010
The Wedding (The Walker Evans Polaroid Project). Notes (Ydessa Hendeles Art Foundation, Toronto), 2011
THE BIRD THAT MADE THE BREEZE TO BLOW. Notes (Ydessa Hendeles Art Foundation, Toronto), 2012
From her wooden sleep... Notes at an Exhibition (Ydessa Hendeles Art Foundation, Toronto), 2015
From her wooden sleep... (Tel Aviv Museum of Art, Tel Aviv), 2016
Death to Pigs. Notes (Ydessa Hendeles Art Foundation, Toronto), 2016
From her wooden sleep... (Hatje Cantz, Ostfildern), 2016<ref>{{cite web|title=Ydessa Hendeles: From her wooden sleep...|url=http://www.hatjecantz.de/ydessa-hendeles-6665-1.html|website=Hatje Cantz|access-date=26 May 2017}}</ref>Death to Pigs (Ydessa Hendeles Art Foundation, Toronto), 2018

 References 

 External links 
Partners (The Teddy Bear Project)
From her wooden sleep as presented at the ICA, London (2015)
Ydessa Hendeles in Canadian Art''
Ydessa Hendeles at Barbara Edwards Contemporary
Death to Pigs at Kunsthalle Wien (2018)

1948 births
Living people
Canadian art curators
Canadian philanthropists
Directors of museums in Canada
Women museum directors
Governor General's Award in Visual and Media Arts winners
Members of the Order of Canada
Members of the Order of Ontario
People from Marburg
People from Toronto
University of Amsterdam alumni
Canadian women philanthropists
Canadian women curators